Sergius was the name of a Roman Patrician Gens, Sergia (or Sergii), originally from Alba Longa (Latium in central Italy). It is also found as Sergios. It may refer to:

Name 
Sergius (name) or Serge, a masculine given name

Roman Catholic Popes 
Pope Sergius I (died 701), Italian-born pope
Pope Sergius II (reigned died 847), Italian-born pope
Pope Sergius III (reigned 904–911), Italian-born pope
Pope Sergius IV (reigned died 1012), Italian-born pope

Eastern Orthodox Patriarchs 
Sergius of Bulgaria, Patriarch of Bulgaria c. 931 – c. 940
Patriarch Sergius I of Constantinople, Patriarch 610–638
Patriarch Sergius II of Constantinople, Patriarch 1001–1019
Patriarch Sergius I of Moscow, Patriarch 1943–1944

Other Patriarchs
Sergius of Tella (died 546), Syriac Orthodox Patriarch of Antioch in 544–546

Other Christian Saints 

Saint Sergius (martyr), Roman soldier companion of Saint Bacchus, martyred c. 303.
Sergius of Cappadocia (died 304), Martyred c. 304.
Sergius of Radonezh (1314–1392), 14th-century Russian monastic
Sergius of Valaam Greek/Karelian/Russian monastic (Possible dates vary, from the 10th century to the mid-14th century)

Dukes of Naples 
Sergius I of Naples (died 864), Duke of Naples 840–864
Sergius II of Naples, Duke of Naples 870–877
Sergius IV of Naples (died 1036), Duke of Naples 1002–1036
Sergius V of Naples (died 1082), Duke of Naples 1042–1082
Sergius VI of Naples (died 1107), Duke of Naples 1082–1097
Sergius VII of Naples (died 1137), Duke of Naples 1120–1137, last Duke of Naples

Dukes of Amalfi 
Sergius I of Amalfi (died 966), Duke of Amalfi 958–966
Sergius II of Amalfi, Duke of Amalfi 1007–1028
Sergius III of Amalfi (died 1073), Duke of Amalfi 1031–1073

Other persons 
Sergius Paulus, proconsul of Cyprus, appears in the Book of Acts
Lucius Sergius Catilina (died 62 BC), 1st century BCE Roman politician
Marcus Sergius, Ancient Roman inventor of the prosthetic hand
Sergius Orata, Ancient Roman merchant and architect
Sergius (Byzantine general), general under Justinian I
Sergius of Reshaina (died 536). Assyrian physician who translated medicine from Greek to Syriac
Sergius-Tychicus, a ninth-century Paulician leader
Metropolitan Sergius (Tikhomirov) of Japan, Russian Orthodox clergyman (1871–1945)
Bahira, also called Sergius (c 600), Nestorian monk who foretold Muhammad's prophetic career
Sergius (Chashin) (born 1974), bishop of the Russian Orthodox Church

Other uses 
"Father Sergius", Short story by Leo Tolstoy
Father Sergius (film), 1917 silent film by Yakov Protazanov based on Tolstoy's story
Father Sergius (1978 film), a 1978 adaptation by Igor Talankin
Church of the Saints Sergius and Bacchus, a former Christian church, now a mosque, in Istanbul
Arch of the Sergii, an ancient Roman triumphal arch in Pula, Croatia
Sergiopolis, the ancient city of Resafa, renamed for the Roman soldier Saint Sergius
Patriarch Sergius XVII, a fictitious character in Xenosaga

See also
 Patriarch Sergius (disambiguation)
 Pope Sergius (disambiguation)
 Serge (name)
 Sergius III (disambiguation)
 Sergius of Naples (disambiguation)

de:Serge
fr:Serge
pl:Sergiusz